Teodoro Vega Morales (born 14 July 1976 in Toluca, Estado de México) is a Mexican long-distance runner who specializes in the 10,000 metres. He has not competed on top level since the 2009 season.

Achievements

Personal bests
3000 metres - 7:58.28 min (2003)
5000 metres - 13:22.40 min (2003)
10,000 metres - 27:37.49 min (2003)

External links

sports-reference

1976 births
Living people
Mexican male long-distance runners
Athletes (track and field) at the 2003 Pan American Games
Athletes (track and field) at the 2004 Summer Olympics
Olympic athletes of Mexico
Sportspeople from the State of Mexico
People from Toluca
Pan American Games medalists in athletics (track and field)
Pan American Games gold medalists for Mexico
Central American and Caribbean Games silver medalists for Mexico
Competitors at the 2002 Central American and Caribbean Games
Central American and Caribbean Games medalists in athletics
Medalists at the 2003 Pan American Games
21st-century Mexican people